Ruth Hartley is a British-French author and artist. She has a sister, Clare, and a half-brother, Rick.

Biography 

Ruth was born on 31st. October 1943 to Alfred Stephen London Hartley and to Muriel Mavis Hartley – known as Pixie - (née Burton) in Salisbury (now Harare) in what was the British colony of Rhodesia, now Zimbabwe. Pixie’s family was among the 1820 settlers in South Africa and moved to Rhodesia in 1922 where Ruth's grandfather, Alfred Ernest Hartley bought a farm.

Ruth obtained a BA in Fine Art from the Michaelis School of Art, University of Cape Town in 1964, a PGCE (Art and Design) in 1981 at Trent Park, Middlesex University, and an MA in Women’s Studies (Video dissertation) from Anglia Ruskin University in Cambridge in 1999. She studied at the London School of Economics in 1968, during a period of upheaval. 

On 4th. October 1968 Ruth married Dr. Michael Bush. they moved to Zambia in 1972 where they lived for 22 years. They divorced in 1996. Ruth has four children, Rachma, a Church of England vicar, Tanvir, a novelist, researcher and disabilities activist and author of 'Witchgirl' and 'Cull', Zoe, an NHS project manager and Ben, the founder of the Ulemu MMA Academy in Lusaka. Ruth has three grandchildren, one of whom is the political commentator and associate editor at the Financial Times, Stephen Bush.|url=https://en.wikipedia.org/wiki/Stephen_Bush

Ruth spent her childhood in Zimbabwe before moving to South Africa in the early 60s to study art. After contravening apartheid laws she had to leave South Africa and sought sanctuary in London. 
 

Ruth has held many exhibitions of her art work, starting in Zambia in 1980, and subsequently in the UK and France. Her painting, The Bombing of Chinkumbi Camp, is in the Zambia National Museum. In 1984 Ruth was invited to become Managing Director of the Mpapa Gallery, founded in Lusaka by Joan Pilcher and Heather Montgomerie as the first gallery in Zambia promoting the work of Zambian artists. She returned to the UK in 1994 to practice and teach art. 

Ruth moved to South-West France in 2008 where she lives in a rural village and since 2017 has been married to John Corley. She continues to write and paint. Her work includes novels, short stories, poetry and memoir, all with an environmental and political flavour.

Selected works

Selected exhibitions 

 (1980), Ruth Bush, One-Woman Show, Exhibition, Mpapa Gallery, Lusaka
 (1989) Zambia 25 Years on the Frontline, Catalogue, The Africa Centre, London
 (2004), Open Studios, Cambridge, Catalogue, p.9
 (2005), RaItz, Leper Chapel, Cambridge
 (2007), with Hamera, K., M’Other Art: Fame. God, and Women. Deconstructing Damien Hirst., St Peter’s Chapel, Cambridge
 (2008), with Hamera, K., Finding Fathers New Hall, Cambridge
 (2016), Corpus at Peleyre Gallery, St Lanne, France

Further reading 

 Borm, P., (20 November 2005), Ruth Hartley: The Fugitive from Rhodesia, Art Beat, The Weekend Mail, Lusaka.
 Bruce, A., (2018), International Contemporaneity and the Third Havana Bienal, What is Critical Curating? / Qu’est-ce que le commissariat engagé?, Revue d'art Canadienne / Canadian Art Revue, Association des universités d’art du Canada / Universities’ Art Association of Canada, Arnprior, Ont. 43, 2, pp. 25-33.
 Ellison G ., (2004) Art in Zambia, Bookworld Publishers, Lusaka
 Guez, N. (ed), (1994) Mpapa Gallery, L’Art Africain Contemporain, Edition 1992-1994, Association Dialogue entre les Cultures, p 235.
 Hartley, R., as Bush D. Ruth, (1992), ‘The Necessity of Creativity: Zambian Artists, Tradition, Creativity and the Rest of the World’, in Zambian Legislation and Practice in Relation to the Preservation of Cultural Property (ed. Zaucha, G), April 1992, Zambia National Committee of the International Council of Museums, Lusaka, pp. 57-62
 MacMillan H., (1997), The Life and Art of Stephen Kappata, African Arts, Los Angeles, Vol. 30, 1, Winter 1997, pp. 20-31
 MacMillan, H , and Shapiro, F., (2017) Zion in Africa, IB Tauris, London, pp 275 and 281
 Mwenya C, (January 10, 2020), Ruth, Cynthia reflect on Mpapa Gallery, Art Yak,, The Weekend Mail, Lusaka.
 New Art from Zambia, (1990) Art from The Frontline, Frontline States/Karia Press, London,
 'Obituary: Landeg White,1940-2017', (3 April 2018) Journal of Southern African Studies, 44, pp. 531-535
 Vladimir Shubin and Daria Zelenova (eds),Oliver Tambo and Kenneth Kaunda: A brief history, (2018) South Africa: Pages of History and Contemporary Politics (Moscow: Institute for African Studies, Russian Academy of Science), pp. 8-14.

References

External links 
Official website
Official website

Living people
1943 births
20th-century British artists
20th-century British writers